The 400 kV Thames Crossing is an overhead power line crossing of the River Thames, between  Botany Marshes in Swanscombe, Kent, and West Thurrock, Essex, England. Its towers are the tallest electricity pylons in the UK.

The present crossing was built in 1965, and comprises two 190-metre (623 feet) tall lattice towers each side of the Thames. Some suggest that the choice of this height was deliberate, being just taller than the BT Tower in London. Each tower has three crossarms and carries two circuits of 400 kV three-phase AC.

400 kV power lines also cross the Thames at the Thames Cable Tunnel, the Dartford Cable Tunnel, and the London Power Tunnels.

132 kV Thames Crossing
There was at one time an earlier 132 kV crossing nearby, with towers 148.4 metres tall. Linking Dagenham and Crossness, it was built between 1927 and 1932 and was part of the Belvedere-Crowlands 132/33/25 kV double circuit. With the cessation of generation at Belvedere Power Station, this line was dismantled in 1987.

2006 death
In March 2006, Paul Smith-Crallan attempted to BASE jump from a platform on the Swanscombe Tower. The parachute he was using is believed to have failed to open, causing him to plunge to his death. This tower is a popular base jumping location because of two platforms that provide good launch points.

Gallery

See also
 Aust Severn Powerline Crossing
 275 kV Forth Crossing
 List of spans
 Powerline river crossings in the United Kingdom
 Crossings of the River Thames

References

External links

Towers in Kent
Powerline river crossings
Electric power infrastructure in England
Electric power transmission in the United Kingdom
1965 establishments in England
Energy infrastructure completed in 1965